Omuk-Kyuyol or "Omuk-Kyuyel" ( or Омук-Кюель; , Omuk-küöle) is a freshwater lake in the Sakha Republic (Yakutia), Russia.

Geography
Omuk-Kyuyol lies north of the Arctic circle, in the southwestern part of the Kolyma Lowland. It is located in an area of lakes between the basin of the Indigirka to the west and the Alazeya to the east. The lake begins to freeze in early October and stays under ice until early June.

See also
List of lakes of Russia

References

External links

Fishing & Tourism in Yakutia

Lakes of the Sakha Republic
East Siberian Lowland
Alazeya basin